Loving Day is an annual national celebration held on June 12, the anniversary of the 1967 United States Supreme Court decision Loving v. Virginia which struck down all anti-miscegenation laws remaining in sixteen U.S. states. In the United States, anti-miscegenation laws were U.S. state laws banning interracial marriage, mainly forbidding marriage between two different races, until the Warren Court ruled unanimously in 1967 that these state laws were unconstitutional. Chief Justice Earl Warren wrote in the court majority opinion that "the freedom to marry, or not marry, a person of another race resides with the individual, and cannot be infringed by the State."

Loving Day is not an officially recognized holiday by the U.S. government, despite attempts to make it so.  Loving Day is the biggest multiracial celebration in the United States.

History
Loving Day originated with the landmark U.S. Supreme Court case Loving v. Virginia, which invalidated laws prohibiting interracial marriage. The case was brought by Mildred Loving, a woman of Black and Native American descent classified as "colored" under Virginia's Racial Integrity Act of 1924, and Richard Loving, a white man. The couple met in Central Point, Virginia, when she was 11 and he was 17. Richard Loving was a family friend and they courted over the years. In June 1958, after she became pregnant, they married in Washington, D.C. Mildred Loving was 18 at the time and reportedly did not realize that interracial marriage was illegal. Five weeks following their wedding, they were arrested and returned to their hometown north of Richmond, Virginia. They pleaded guilty to charges of "cohabiting as man and wife, against the peace and dignity of the Commonwealth." The Lovings were sentenced to a year in prison but avoided jail time by leaving Virginia and agreeing not to return to the state for 25 years.

The Lovings moved to Washington, D.C. and began legal action by writing to U.S. Attorney General Robert F. Kennedy. Kennedy referred the case to the American Civil Liberties Union. Two lawyers, Bernard Cohen and Philip Hirschkop, took up the case, arguing that the Virginia law violated the Equal Protection Clause of the 14th Amendment.

The Warren Court unanimously ruled in favor of the young couple on June 12, 1967, nine years after their wedding, and they returned to Virginia, where they lived with their three children. The court's ruling eliminated anti-miscegenation laws in all 16 states that had them.

In 1975, Richard Loving died in a car accident. Mildred Loving died May 5, 2008, at the age of 68.

Legacy
Many organizations sponsor annual parties across the country, with Lovingday.org providing an online legal map, courtroom history of anti-miscegenation laws, as well as offering testimonials by and resources for interracial couples. Inspired by Juneteenth (which commemorates the end of slavery in the state of Texas), Loving Day seeks both to commemorate and celebrate the Supreme Court's 1967 ruling, keeping its importance fresh in the minds of a generation which has grown up with interracial relationships being legal, as well as explore issues facing couples currently in interracial relationships. The Loving Day website features information, including court transcripts of the Loving v. Virginia case and of other court cases in which the legality of anti-miscegenation laws was challenged. To celebrate the holiday, people are encouraged to hold parties in which the case and its modern-day legacy are discussed, in smaller settings such as living rooms, backyards, etc., as well as in larger gatherings.  Ken Tanabe is credited with forming the idea for Loving Day.  He created the idea in 2004 for his senior thesis at Parsons the New School of Design.

In popular culture
Loving, a 2016 film starring Ruth Negga and Joel Edgerton as Mildred and Richard Loving, directed by Jeff Nichols.  The film was selected to compete for the Palme d'Or at the 2016 Cannes Film Festival, and was nominated for numerous awards, including a Golden Globe nomination for Best Actor for Edgerton and Academy Award and Golden Globe nominations for Negga.
A documentary, The Loving Story, which features rare contemporaneous photographs of the couple and details the history of the case and references Loving Day, premiered on HBO on Valentine's Day 2012.
 New York Times best-selling author Heidi W. Durrow co-organized the second-largest celebration of Loving Day in the country with Fanshen Cox DiGiovanni, during the annual Mixed Roots Film and Literary Festival.
 The annual flagship Loving Day Celebration in New York City was featured in the BBC documentary series Our World in 2007, on the 40th anniversary of the Loving decision. Coverage of the annual celebration has also been featured in Time Magazine, on the Voice of America, National Public Radio, The Washington Post, and on PBS NewsHour.
 Several cities and municipalities have issued proclamations officially recognizing Loving Day as a holiday, including Washington, D.C., and Caroline County, Virginia, where the Lovings hailed from.
 "Loving v. Virginia," an opera, is scheduled to premier in 2025 at the Harrison Opera House in Richmond Virginia.

Outside the U.S.
Since 2013, Loving Day has been celebrated with an annual symposium at De Balie theater in Amsterdam, organized by the Stichting Loving Day foundation.

See also
 Mixed Race Day

References

External links
 Lovingday.org, Official site
 The Washington Post article about Loving Day
 Village Voice interview about Loving Day
 The Huffington Post article about Loving Day and interview with founder, Ken Tanabe
 MSNBC article "Matriarch of racially mixed marriages dies"
 ABC News video of report on Loving family

Interracial marriage in the United States
June observances
Public holidays in the United States
Unofficial observances
Mildred and Richard Loving